The Magnus Erikssons landslag (Country Law of Magnus Eriksson) also called only Landslagen (Country Law) was a Swedish law passed by king Magnus IV in circa 1341. It was the first attempt to a law applying to the entire nation of Sweden, replacing the previous local county laws of the Medieval Scandinavian law. The Country Law applied to the entire countryside, but not to the cities, which were governed according to the Stadslagen (City Law), which were issued in about the same time, but were separate laws. The Kristofers landslag from 1442, was an amended version this law, in effect in Sweden-Finland until the Civil Code of 1734.

The law was divided into the following chapters (balk):
Kyrkobalken - The Chuch
Konungabalken - The King
Giftermålsbalken - Marriage
Ärvdabalken - Inheritance
Jordabalken - Land
Byggningabalken - Buildings
Köpmålabalken - Merchants
Tingmålabalken - Court
Edsöresbalken - Breach of Peace
Högmålsbalken - Capital cases
Dråp med vilja - Intentional homicide
Dråp med våda - Involuntary manslaughter
Såramål med vilja - Deliberate Assault 
Såramål med våda - Accidental assault
Tjuvabalken - Theft

References

 Nationalencyklopedin (NE)

1340s in law
Political history of Sweden
14th century in Sweden
Legal history of Sweden
1341 in Europe